Blue Notes in the Basement is the debut album of Ultra Naté. It was released in 1991 on Warner Bros. Records. It includes the singles "It's Over Now," "Scandal," "Deeper Love (Missing You)," "Rejoicing (I'll Never Forget)," and Is It Love?"

Track listing
"Blue Notes"
"Sands of Time"
"Is It Love?"
"Deeper Love (Missing You)"
"You and Me Together"
"It's Over Now"
"Scandal"
"Rejoicing (I'll Never Forget)"
"Rain"
"Love Hungover"
"It's My World" (feat. Lisa Rasta)
"Funny (How Things Change)"

External links
Ultra Naté - Blue Notes In The Basement

References

1991 debut albums
Ultra Naté albums
Warner Records albums